Columbia (US-16) was the successful defender of the 1958 America's Cup for the New York Yacht Club, besting the British challenger Sceptre.

Career
Columbia was designed by Olin Stephens and built by Nevins.  Built to compete for the right to defend the '58 America's Cup, she was owned by a syndicate headed by New York Yacht Club members Henry Sears, Gerard B. Lambert, Briggs Cunningham, Vincent Astor, James A. Farrell, A. Howard Fuller, and William T. Moore.

Columbia was helmed by Cunningham, the inventor of the cunningham downhaul, with syndicate head Sears as navigator. After defeating Sceptre in the Cup challenge, she went on to a long career competing in the Defender trials for the 1962, 1964, and 1967 America's Cup competitions.

References

External links

Yachts of New York Yacht Club members
America's Cup defenders
Individual sailing vessels
Sailboat type designs by Olin Stephens
1950s sailing yachts
Sailing yachts built in the United States
12-metre class yachts
Ships built in City Island, Bronx